Bobby Shou Wood (born November 15, 1992) is an American professional soccer player who plays as a striker for Major League Soccer club New England Revolution.

Youth and early career
Wood was born in Honolulu, Hawaii, to a mother with partial Japanese ancestry and a father with African American ancestry. He began his youth career in 1999 with Powder Edge SC, located in Honolulu, Hawaii. He moved to California in 2005 to play with the Irvine Strikers.

Club career
Wood relocated to Germany in July 2007 to join the academy of 1860 Munich.

1860 Munich
On January 29, 2011, Wood made his professional debut coming on in the 82nd minute as a substitute during a 2. Bundesliga match against MSV Duisburg.

Wood made his first career start for 1860 Munich in October 2011 against F.C. Hansa Rostock. On November 30, 2012, against VfR Aalen, Wood scored his first professional goal to secure a 1–1 draw for 1860 Munich.

In December 2012, Wood signed his first professional contract, extending his stay with 1860 through the 2016 season.

Loan to Erzgebirge Aue
In February 2015, Wood moved to fellow 2. Bundesliga side Erzgebirge Aue, signing a contract until 2017. For Aue, Wood made nine league appearances and scored three goals before seeing the club relegated to 3. Liga for the first time in six years.

Union Berlin
In July 2015, Wood signed a three-year contract with 1. FC Union Berlin for an undisclosed fee. In his Union Berlin debut season, Wood broke the record for goals scored by an American in a single season in Germany's top two flights.

Hamburger SV

On May 15, 2016, Wood signed a four-year deal with Hamburger SV. On August 27, Wood made his Bundesliga debut with Hamburg against FC Ingolstadt. In the 1–1 draw, Wood scored the opening goal with a fantastic strike from the edge of the box, beating out Ingolstadt defender Marvin Matip after receiving a long pass from keeper René Adler. After his debut, manager Bruno Labbadia commented that Wood "has lots of pace and uses his body skillfully". His goal was later voted as the Goal of the Week in the Bundesliga. Wood scored the first goal on September 10 at Bayer Leverkusen after Bayer keeper Bernd Leno came well off his line, but a late hat trick from Joel Pohjanpalo made the result 3–1 in favor of Bayer.

Following the match against Leverkusen, however, the entire Hamburg team entered a dry spell in scoring lasting over a month, resulting in the sacking of Labbadia on September 25. Wood made his first start under new manager Markus Gisdol on October 25 in their second round DFB-Pokal match against Hallescher FC, scoring twice in the 4–0 victory. However, their problems in the league persisted, culminating in Wood being sent off in his first Bundesliga start under Gisdol, coming five days later at 1. FC Köln. After the match, Gisdol told reporters that Wood's red card, given when he elbowed Köln defender Dominique Heintz in the stomach, was "inexcusable", and Wood was handed a three-match ban by the DFB.

After the 1. FC Köln match, Hamburg won three of their six remaining matches with Wood scoring one goal in the 2–1 win against FC Schalke 04 on matchday 16. Hamburg finished the year ranked 16th. In the following year, Hamburg started with two defeats against VfL Wolfsburg (1–0) and FC Ingolstadt both away (3–1), before the Northern Germans won six of the following ten matches and climbed to 13th. Wood scored a goal during this time against Borussia Mönchengladbach in a 2–1 victory. The following four matches ended with three defeats and one draw, placing Hamburg in 16th after matchday 32.  In the penultimate matchday, Hamburg drew 1–1 against FC Schalke 04 away, after the goal of Pierre-Michel Lasogga in injury time. Before the goal of Lasogga, Wood had an opportunity to equalize. Through the draw, Hamburg saved themselves from relegation. The last matchday one week later, Hamburg won 2–1 against VfL Wolfsburg and saves with the 14th rank before the relegation.

In the 2017–18 season, Hamburg lost in the first round of the DFB-Pokal (German Cup) against the third-tier side VfL Osnabrück 3–1. Hamburg won their first two matches with Wood scoring a goal in the 3–1 win away against 1. FC Köln. In the remaining matches of the first half of the season, Hamburg won only two matches and ranked 17th. In the second season-half, manager Gisdol was sacked after a 2–0 defeat against Cologne at home. His successor Bernd Hollerbach was sacked after seven matches without a victory. The new president of the club, Bernd Hoffmann, sacked CEO Heribert Bruchhagen and the director of sport, Jens Todt, and the successor of Hollerbach became Christian Titz, former head coach of the reserve team. Hamburg won four of their eight remaining matches with Wood scoring a penalty in a 3–1 win away against VfL Wolfsburg on matchday 32. Hamburg relegated despite a 2–1 win against Borussia Mönchengladbach on the last matchday for the first time in their history as VfL Wolfsburg won against Cologne. In the match against Borussia Mönchengladbach, Wood would see a red card.

Loan to Hannover 96 
On July 9, 2018, it was announced that Wood would be joining Hannover 96 on loan until the end of 2018–19 season with an option to buy.

Real Salt Lake 
On April 2, 2021, Major League Soccer side Real Salt Lake announced that it had signed Wood to a contract to take effect July 1, 2021 through the 2023 season.
On April 13, 2021, Hamburger SV announced that Wood's contract was cancelled prematurely, allowing him to join Real Salt Lake immediately and in time for the season start. Following the 2022 season, his contract option was declined by Salt Lake.

Loan to Real Monarchs 
On October 7, 2021, Wood was sent on loan to Real Salt Lake's reserve side, Real Monarchs on a loan for the remainder of the 2021 USL Championship season.

New England Revolution
Wood was selected New England Revolution in the 2022 MLS Re-Entry Draft on November 22, 2022. He was officially signed by New England on December 5, 2022 on a one-year deal for the upcoming 2023 season.

International career
In May 2013, Wood was named to a preliminary United States' 35-man roster for the 2013 Gold Cup. Wood made his senior international debut in a friendly match against Bosnia and Herzegovina in August 2013.

Wood scored his first senior international goal in June 2015, a game-winner in a 4–3 victory against the Netherlands. Five days later, Wood scored the game-winning goal in a 2–1 friendly victory against top-ranked Germany in Cologne. In the 2015 CONCACAF Cup against Mexico to decide which team would qualify for the 2017 Confederations Cup, coach Jürgen Klinsmann substituted Wood on in the 98th minute, after Mexico scored the go-ahead goal in extra time. Wood scored the tying goal in the 108th minute on a through ball from DeAndre Yedlin, but the United States ended up losing the match on an additional extra time goal from Mexico. On September 5, 2017, Wood scored the tying goal in the 85th minute against Honduras to keep the US hopes alive in the CONCACAF qualifications for the 2018 FIFA World Cup in Russia, securing a 1–1 draw. On October 6, he scored a goal to give a 4–0 lead for United States against Panama with one more match in the group to spare.

Career statistics

Club

1.Includes DFB-Pokal and U.S. Open Cup.
1.Includes playoff appearances.

International

International statistics

Scores and results list United States' goal tally first, score column indicates score after each Wood goal.

References

External links
US Soccer bio

1992 births
Living people
American sportspeople of Japanese descent
African-American soccer players
American soccer players
Soccer players from Honolulu
Association football forwards
United States men's international soccer players
United States men's under-23 international soccer players
United States men's under-20 international soccer players
Copa América Centenario players
TSV 1860 Munich II players
TSV 1860 Munich players
FC Erzgebirge Aue players
1. FC Union Berlin players
Hamburger SV players
Hannover 96 players
New England Revolution players
Real Monarchs players
Real Salt Lake players
Major League Soccer players
USL Championship players
Bundesliga players
2. Bundesliga players
Regionalliga players
American expatriate soccer players
Expatriate footballers in Germany
American expatriate soccer players in Germany
21st-century African-American sportspeople